A Fresnel lens (or  ) is a type of composite compact lens developed by the French physicist Augustin-Jean Fresnel (1788–1827) for use in lighthouses. It has been called "the invention that saved a million ships."

The design allows the construction of lenses of large aperture and short focal length without the mass and volume of material that would be required by a lens of conventional design. A Fresnel lens can be made much thinner than a comparable conventional lens, in some cases taking the form of a flat sheet. The simpler dioptric (purely refractive) form of the lens was first proposed by Count Buffon and independently reinvented by Fresnel. The catadioptric form of the lens, entirely invented by Fresnel, has outer elements that use total internal reflection as well as refraction; it can capture more oblique light from a light source and add it to the beam of a lighthouse, making the light visible from greater distances.

Description 

The Fresnel lens reduces the amount of material required compared to a conventional lens by dividing the lens into a set of concentric annular sections. An ideal Fresnel lens would have an infinite number of sections. In each section, the overall thickness is decreased compared to an equivalent simple lens. This effectively divides the continuous surface of a standard lens into a set of surfaces of the same curvature, with stepwise discontinuities between them.

In some lenses, the curved surfaces are replaced with flat surfaces, with a different angle in each section. Such a lens can be regarded as an array of prisms arranged in a circular fashion with steeper prisms on the edges and a flat or slightly convex center. In the first (and largest) Fresnel lenses, each section was actually a separate prism. 'Single-piece' Fresnel lenses were later produced, being used for automobile headlamps, brake, parking, and turn signal lenses, and so on. In modern times, computer-controlled milling equipment (CNC) or 3-D printers might be used to manufacture more complex lenses.

Fresnel lens design allows a substantial reduction in thickness (and thus mass and volume of material) at the expense of reducing the imaging quality of the lens, which is why precise imaging applications such as photography usually still use larger conventional lenses.

Fresnel lenses are usually made of glass or plastic; their size varies from large (old historical lighthouses, meter size) to medium (book-reading aids, OHP viewgraph projectors) to small (TLR/SLR camera screens, micro-optics). In many cases they are very thin and flat, almost flexible, with thicknesses in the  range.

Most modern Fresnel lenses consist only of refractive elements. Lighthouse lenses, however, tend to include both refracting and reflecting elements, the latter being outside the metal rings seen in the photographs. While the inner elements are sections of refractive lenses, the outer elements are reflecting prisms, each of which performs two refractions and one total internal reflection, avoiding the light loss that occurs in reflection from a silvered mirror.

Lighthouse lens sizes 

Fresnel designed six sizes of lighthouse lenses, divided into four orders based on their size and focal length. In modern use, these are classified as first through sixth order. An intermediate size between third and fourth order was added later, as well as sizes above first order and below sixth.

The largest Fresnel lenses are called hyperradiant (or hyper-radial). One such lens was on hand when it was decided to build and outfit the Makapuu Point Light in Hawaii.

Types
There are two main types of Fresnel lens: imaging and non-imaging. Imaging Fresnel lenses use segments with curved cross-sections and produce sharp images, while non-imaging lenses have segments with flat cross-sections, and do not produce sharp images. As the number of segments increases, the two types of lens become more similar to each other. In the abstract case of an infinite number of segments, the difference between curved and flat segments disappears.

Imaging
Spherical A spherical Fresnel lens is equivalent to a simple spherical lens, using ring-shaped segments that are each a portion of a sphere, that all focus light on a single point. This type of lens produces a sharp image, although not quite as clear as the equivalent simple spherical lens due to diffraction at the edges of the ridges.

Cylindrical A cylindrical Fresnel lens is equivalent to a simple cylindrical lens, using straight segments with circular cross-section, focusing light on a single line. This type produces a sharp image, although not quite as clear as the equivalent simple cylindrical lens due to diffraction at the edges of the ridges.

Non-imaging
Spot A non-imaging spot Fresnel lens uses ring-shaped segments with cross sections that are straight lines rather than circular arcs. Such a lens can focus light on a small spot, but does not produce a sharp image. These lenses have application in solar power, such as focusing sunlight on a solar panel. Fresnel lenses may be used as components of Köhler illumination optics resulting in very effective nonimaging optics Fresnel-Köhler (FK) solar concentrators.

Linear A non-imaging linear Fresnel lens uses straight segments whose cross sections are straight lines rather than arcs. These lenses focus light into a narrow band. They do not produce a sharp image, but can be used in solar power, such as for focusing sunlight on a pipe, to heat the water within.

Uses

Imaging

Fresnel lenses are used as simple hand-held magnifiers. They are also used to correct several visual disorders, including ocular-motility disorders such as strabismus. Fresnel lenses have been used to increase the visual size of CRT displays in pocket televisions, notably the Sinclair TV80. They are also used in traffic lights.

Fresnel lenses are used in left-hand-drive European lorries entering the UK and Republic of Ireland (and vice versa, right-hand-drive Irish and British trucks entering mainland Europe) to overcome the blind spots caused by the driver operating the lorry while sitting on the wrong side of the cab relative to the side of the road the car is on. They attach to the passenger-side window.

Another automobile application of a Fresnel lens is a rear view enhancer, as the wide view angle of a lens attached to the rear window permits examining the scene behind a vehicle, particularly a tall or bluff-tailed one, more effectively than a rear-view mirror alone.

Multi-focal Fresnel lenses are also used as a part of retina identification cameras, where they provide multiple in- and out-of-focus images of a fixation target inside the camera. For virtually all users, at least one of the images will be in focus, thus allowing correct eye alignment.

Fresnel lenses have also been used in the field of popular entertainment. The British rock artist Peter Gabriel made use of them in his early solo live performances to magnify the size of his head, in contrast to the rest of his body, for dramatic and comic effect. In the Terry Gilliam film Brazil, plastic Fresnel screens appear ostensibly as magnifiers for the small CRT monitors used throughout the offices of the Ministry of Information. However, they occasionally appear between the actors and the camera, distorting the scale and composition of the scene to humorous effect. The Pixar movie Wall-E features a Fresnel lens in the scenes where the protagonist watches the musical Hello, Dolly! magnified on an iPod.

Virtual reality headsets, such as the Meta Quest 2 and the HTC Vive Pro use Fresnel lenses, as they allow a thinner and lighter form factor than regular lenses. Newer devices, such as the Meta Quest Pro, have switched to a pancake lens design due to its smaller form factor and less chromatic aberration than Fresnel lenses.

Photography

Canon and Nikon have used Fresnel lenses to reduce the size of telephoto lenses. Photographic lenses that include Fresnel elements can be much shorter than corresponding conventional lens design. Nikon calls the technology Phase Fresnel.

The Polaroid SX-70 camera used a Fresnel reflector as part of its viewing system.

View and large format cameras can utilize a Fresnel lens in conjunction with the ground glass, to increase the perceived brightness of the image projected by a lens onto the ground glass, thus aiding in adjusting focus and composition.

Illumination

High-quality glass Fresnel lenses were used in lighthouses, where they were considered state of the art in the late 19th and through the middle of the 20th centuries; most lighthouses have now retired glass Fresnel lenses from service and replaced them with much less expensive and more durable aerobeacons, which themselves often contain plastic Fresnel lenses. Lighthouse Fresnel lens systems typically include extra annular prismatic elements, arrayed in faceted domes above and below the central planar Fresnel, in order to catch all light emitted from the light source. The light path through these elements can include an internal reflection, rather than the simple refraction in the planar Fresnel element. These lenses conferred many practical benefits upon the designers, builders, and users of lighthouses and their illumination. Among other things, smaller lenses could fit into more compact spaces. Greater light transmission over longer distances, and varied patterns, made it possible to triangulate a position.

Perhaps the most widespread use of Fresnel lenses, for a time, occurred in automobile headlamps, where they can shape the roughly parallel beam from the parabolic reflector to meet requirements for dipped and main-beam patterns, often both in the same headlamp unit (such as the European H4 design). For reasons of economy, weight, and impact resistance, newer cars have dispensed with glass Fresnel lenses, using multifaceted reflectors with plain polycarbonate lenses. However, Fresnel lenses continue in wide use in automobile tail, marker, and reversing lights.

Glass Fresnel lenses also are used in lighting instruments for theatre and motion pictures (see Fresnel lantern); such instruments are often called simply Fresnels. The entire instrument consists of a metal housing, a reflector, a lamp assembly, and a Fresnel lens. Many Fresnel instruments allow the lamp to be moved relative to the lens' focal point, to increase or decrease the size of the light beam. As a result, they are very flexible, and can often produce a beam as narrow as 7° or as wide as 70°. The Fresnel lens produces a very soft-edged beam, so is often used as a wash light. A holder in front of the lens can hold a colored plastic film (gel) to tint the light or wire screens or frosted plastic to diffuse it. The Fresnel lens is useful in the making of motion pictures not only because of its ability to focus the beam brighter than a typical lens, but also because the light is a relatively consistent intensity across the entire width of the beam of light.

Aircraft carriers and naval air stations typically use Fresnel lenses in their optical landing systems. The "meatball" light aids the pilot in maintaining proper glide slope for the landing. In the center are amber and red lights composed of Fresnel lenses. Although the lights are always on, the angle of the lens from the pilot's point of view determines the color and position of the visible light. If the lights appear above the green horizontal bar, the pilot is too high. If it is below, the pilot is too low, and if the lights are red, the pilot is very low.

Fresnel lenses are also commonly used in searchlights, spotlights, and flashlights.

Projection
The use of Fresnel lenses for image projection reduces image quality, so they tend to occur only where quality is not critical or where the bulk of a solid lens would be prohibitive. Cheap Fresnel lenses can be stamped or molded of transparent plastic and are used in overhead projectors and projection televisions.

Fresnel lenses of different focal lengths (one collimator, and one collector) are used in commercial and DIY projection. The collimator lens has the lower focal length and is placed closer to the light source, and the collector lens, which focuses the light into the triplet lens, is placed after the projection image (an active matrix LCD panel in LCD projectors). Fresnel lenses are also used as collimators in overhead projectors.

Solar power
Since plastic Fresnel lenses can be made larger than glass lenses, as well as being much cheaper and lighter, they are used to concentrate sunlight for heating in solar cookers, in solar forges, and in solar collectors used to heat water for domestic use. They can also be used to generate steam or to power a Stirling engine.

Fresnel lenses can concentrate sunlight onto solar cells with a ratio of almost 500:1. This allows the active solar-cell surface to be reduced, lowering cost and allowing the use of more efficient cells that would otherwise be too expensive. In the early 21st century, Fresnel reflectors began to be used in concentrating solar power (CSP) plants to concentrate solar energy. One application was to preheat water at the coal-fired Liddell Power Station, in Hunter Valley Australia.

Fresnel lenses can be used to sinter sand, allowing 3D printing in glass.

History

Forerunners

Augustin-Jean Fresnel was not the first person to focus a lighthouse beam using a lens. That distinction apparently belongs to the London glass-cutter Thomas Rogers, who proposed the idea to Trinity House in 1788. The first Rogers lenses, 53cm in diameter and 14cm thick at the center, were installed at the Old Lower Lighthouse at Portland Bill in 1789. Behind each lamp was a back-coated spherical glass mirror, which reflected rear radiation back through the lamp and into the lens. Further samples were installed at Howth Baily, North Foreland, and at least four other locations by 1804. But much of the light was wasted by absorption in the glass.

Nor was Fresnel the first to suggest replacing a convex lens with a series of concentric annular prisms, to reduce weight and absorption. In 1748, Count Buffon proposed grinding such prisms as steps in a single piece of glass. In 1790 (although secondary sources give the date as 1773 or 1788), the Marquis de Condorcet suggested that it would be easier to make the annular sections separately and assemble them on a frame; but even that was impractical at the time. These designs were intended not for lighthouses, but for burning glasses. David Brewster, however, proposed a system similar to Condorcet's in 1811, and by 1820 was advocating its use in British lighthouses.

Fresnel's contributions

The French  (Commission of Lighthouses) was established by Napoleon in 1811, and placed under the authority of Fresnel's employer, the Corps of Bridges and Roads. As the members of the commission were otherwise occupied, it achieved little in its early years. But on 21 June 1819—three months after winning the physics  of the Academy of Sciences for his celebrated memoir on diffraction—Fresnel was "temporarily" seconded to the commission on the recommendation of François Arago (a member since 1813), to review possible improvements in lighthouse illumination.

By the end of August 1819, unaware of the Buffon-Condorcet-Brewster proposal, Fresnel made his first presentation to the commission, recommending what he called  ('lenses by steps') to replace the reflectors then in use, which reflected only about half of the incident light. Much to Fresnel's embarrassment, one of the assembled commissioners, Jacques Charles, recalled Buffon's suggestion. However, whereas Buffon's version was biconvex and in one piece, Fresnel's was plano-convex and made of multiple prisms for easier construction. With an official budget of 500 francs, Fresnel approached three manufacturers. The third, François Soleil, found a way to remove defects by reheating and remolding the glass. Arago assisted Fresnel with the design of a modified Argand lamp with concentric wicks (a concept that Fresnel attributed to Count Rumford), and accidentally discovered that fish glue was heat-resistant, making it suitable for use in the lens. The prototype, finished in March 1820, had a square lens panel 55cm on a side, containing 97 polygonal (not annular) prisms—and so impressed the Commission that Fresnel was asked for a full eight-panel version. This model, completed a year later in spite of insufficient funding, had panels 76cm square. In a public spectacle on the evening of 13 April 1821, it was demonstrated by comparison with the most recent reflectors, which it suddenly rendered obsolete.

Soon after this demonstration, Fresnel published the idea that light, including apparently unpolarized light, consists exclusively of transverse waves, and went on to consider the implications for double refraction and partial reflection.

Fresnel acknowledged the British lenses and Buffon's invention in a memoir read on 29 July 1822 and printed in the same year. The date of that memoir may be the source of the claim that Fresnel's lighthouse advocacy began two years later than Brewster's; but the text makes it clear that Fresnel's involvement began no later than 1819.

Fresnel's next lens was a rotating apparatus with eight "bull's-eye" panels, made in annular arcs by Saint-Gobain, giving eight rotating beams—to be seen by mariners as a periodic flash. Above and behind each main panel was a smaller, sloping bull's-eye panel of trapezoidal outline with trapezoidal elements. This refracted the light to a sloping plane mirror, which then reflected it horizontally, 7 degrees ahead of the main beam, increasing the duration of the flash. Below the main panels were 128 small mirrors arranged in four rings, stacked like the slats of a louver or Venetian blind. Each ring, shaped like a frustum of a cone, reflected the light to the horizon, giving a fainter steady light between the flashes. The apparatus was stored at Bordeaux for the winter, and then reassembled at Cordouan Lighthouse under Fresnel's supervision—in part by Fresnel's own hands. On 25 July 1823, the world's first lighthouse Fresnel lens was lit. As expected, the light was visible to the horizon, more than  out.

The day before the test of the Cordouan lens in Paris, a committee of the Academy of Sciences reported on Fresnel's memoir and supplements on double refraction—which, although less well known to modern readers than his earlier work on diffraction, struck a more decisive blow for the wave theory of light. Between the test and the reassembly at Cordouan, Fresnel submitted his papers on photoelasticity (16 September 1822), elliptical and circular polarization and optical rotation (9 December), and partial reflection and total internal reflection (7 January 1823), essentially completing his reconstruction of physical optics on the transverse wave hypothesis. Shortly after the Cordouan lens was lit, Fresnel started coughing up blood.

In the same year he designed the first fixed lens—for spreading light evenly around the horizon while minimizing waste above or below. Ideally the curved refracting surfaces would be segments of toroids about a common vertical axis, so that the dioptric panel would look like a cylindrical drum. If this was supplemented by reflecting (catoptric) rings above and below the refracting (dioptric) parts, the entire apparatus would look like a beehive. The second Fresnel lens to enter service was indeed a fixed lens, of third order, installed at Dunkirk by 1 February 1825. However, due to the difficulty of fabricating large toroidal prisms, this apparatus had a 16-sided polygonal plan.

In 1825 Fresnel extended his fixed-lens design by adding a rotating array outside the fixed array. Each panel of the rotating array was to refract part of the fixed light from a horizontal fan into a narrow beam.

In late 1825, to reduce the loss of light in the reflecting elements, Fresnel proposed to replace each mirror with a catadioptric prism, through which the light would travel by refraction through the first surface, then total internal reflection off the second surface, then refraction through the third surface. The result was the lighthouse lens as we now know it.

After Fresnel

The first stage of the development of lighthouse lenses after the death of Augustin Fresnel consisted in the implementation of his designs. This was driven in part by his younger brother Léonor—who, like Augustin, was trained as a civil engineer but, unlike Augustin, had a strong aptitude for management. Léonor entered the service of the Lighthouse Commission in 1825, and went on to succeed Augustin as Secretary.

The first fixed lens to be constructed with toroidal prisms was a first-order apparatus designed by the Scottish engineer Alan Stevenson under the guidance of Léonor Fresnel, and fabricated by Isaac Cookson & Co. using French glass; it entered service at the Isle of May, Scotland, on 22 September 1836. The first large catadioptric lenses were made in 1842 for the lighthouses at Gravelines and Île Vierge, France; these were fixed third-order lenses whose catadioptric rings (made in segments) were one metre in diameter. Stevenson's first-order Skerryvore lens, lit in 1844, was only partly catadioptric; it was similar to the Cordouan lens except that the lower slats were replaced by French-made catadioptric prisms, while mirrors were retained at the top. The first fully catadioptric first-order lens, installed at Pointe d'Ailly in 1852, also gave eight rotating beams plus a fixed light at the bottom; but its top section had eight catadioptric panels focusing the light about 4 degrees ahead of the main beams, in order to lengthen the flashes. The first fully catadioptric lens with purely revolving beams—also of first order—was installed at Saint-Clément-des-Baleines in 1854, and marked the completion of Augustin Fresnel's original Carte des Phares.

Thomas Stevenson (younger brother of Alan) went a step beyond Fresnel with his "holophotal" lens, which focused the light radiated by the lamp in nearly all directions, forward or backward, into a single beam. The first version, described in 1849, consisted of a standard Fresnel bull's-eye lens, a paraboloidal reflector, and a rear hemispherical reflector (functionally equivalent to the Rogers mirror of 60 years earlier, except that it subtended a whole hemisphere). Light radiated into the forward hemisphere but missing the bull's-eye lens was deflected by the paraboloid into a parallel beam surrounding the bull's-eye lens, while light radiated into the backward hemisphere was reflected back through the lamp by the spherical reflector (as in Rogers' arrangement), to be collected by the forward components. The first unit was installed at North Harbour, Peterhead, in August 1849. Stevenson called this version a "catadioptric holophote", although each of its elements was either purely reflective or purely refractive. In the second version of the holophote concept, the bull's-eye lens and paraboloidal reflector were replaced by a catadioptric Fresnel lens—as conceived by Fresnel, but expanded to cover the whole forward hemisphere. The third version, which Stevenson confusingly called a "dioptric holophote", was more innovative: it retained the catadioptric Fresnel lens for the front hemisphere, but replaced the rear hemispherical reflector with a hemispherical array of annular prisms, each of which used two total internal reflections to turn light diverging from the center of the hemisphere back toward the center. The result was an all-glass holophote, with no losses from metallic reflections.

James Timmins Chance modified Thomas Stevenson's all-glass holophotal design by arranging the double-reflecting prisms about a vertical axis. The prototype was shown at the 1862 International Exhibition in London. Later, to ease manufacturing, Chance divided the prisms into segments, and arranged them in a cylindrical form while retaining the property of reflecting light from a single point back to that point. Reflectors of this form, paradoxically called "dioptric mirrors", proved particularly useful for returning light from the landward side of the lamp to the seaward side.

As lighthouses proliferated, they became harder to distinguish from each other, leading to the use of colored filters, which wasted light. In 1884, John Hopkinson eliminated the need for filters by inventing the "group-flashing" lens, in which the dioptric and/or the catadioptric panels were split so as to give multiple flashes—allowing lighthouses to be identified not only by frequency of flashes, but also by multiplicity of flashes. Double-flashing lenses were installed at Tampico (Mexico) and Little Basses (Sri Lanka) in 1875, and a triple-flashing lens at Casquets Lighthouse (Channel Islands) in 1876. The example shown (right) is the double-flashing lens of the Point Arena Light, which was in service from 1908 to 1977.

The development of hyper-radial lenses was driven in part by the need for larger light sources, such as gas lights with multiple jets, which required a longer focal length for a given beam-width, hence a larger lens to collect a given fraction of the generated light. The first hyper-radial lens was built for the Stevensons in 1885 by F. Barbier & Cie of France, and tested at South Foreland Lighthouse with various light sources. Chance Brothers (Hopkinson's employers) then began constructing hyper-radials, installing their first at Bishop Rock Lighthouse in 1887. In the same year, Barbier installed a hyper-radial at Tory Island. But only about 30 hyper-radials went into service before the development of more compact bright lamps rendered such large optics unnecessary (see Hyperradiant Fresnel lens).

Production of one-piece stepped dioptric lenses—roughly as envisaged by Buffon—became feasible in 1852, when John L. Gilliland of the Brooklyn Flint-Glass Company patented a method of making lenses from pressed and molded glass. The company made small bull's-eye lenses for use on railroads, steamboats, and docks; such lenses were common in the United States by the 1870s. In 1858 the company produced "a very small number of pressed flint-glass sixth-order lenses" for use in lighthouses—the first Fresnel lighthouse lenses made in America. By the 1950s, the substitution of plastic for glass made it economic to use Fresnel lenses as condensers in overhead projectors.

See also
 Fresnel imager
 Fresnel zone plate
 Lenticular lens
 Linear Fresnel reflector
 Prism lighting − Fresnel anidolic optics

References

Bibliography
 M. Born and E. Wolf, Principles of Optics, 7th Ed., Cambridge, 1999.
 G.-A. Boutry, 1948, "Augustin Fresnel: His time, life and work, 1788–1827", Science Progress, vol. 36, no. 144 (October 1948), pp. 587–604; jstor.org/stable/43413515.
 J.Z. Buchwald, 1989, The Rise of the Wave Theory of Light: Optical Theory and Experiment in the Early Nineteenth Century, University of Chicago Press, .
 J. Elton, 2009, "A Light to Lighten our Darkness: Lighthouse Optics and the Later Development of Fresnel's Revolutionary Refracting Lens 1780–1900", International Journal for the History of Engineering & Technology, vol. 79, no. 2 (July 2009), pp. 183–244; .
 A. Fresnel, 1822, "Mémoire sur un nouveau système d'éclairage des phares", read 29 July 1822; reprinted in Fresnel, 1866–70, vol. 3, pp. 97–126; translated by T. Tag as "Memoir upon a new system of lighthouse illumination", U.S. Lighthouse Society, accessed 26 August 2017; archived 19 August 2016. (Cited page numbers refer to the translation.)
 A. Fresnel (ed. H. de Sénarmont, E. Verdet, and L. Fresnel), 1866–70, Oeuvres complètes d'Augustin Fresnel (3 vols.), Paris: Imprimerie Impériale; vol. 1 (1866), vol. 2 (1868), vol. 3 (1870).
 T.H. Levitt, 2013, A Short Bright Flash: Augustin Fresnel and the Birth of the Modern Lighthouse, New York: W.W. Norton, .
 T. Young (ed. G. Peacock), 1855, Miscellaneous Works of the late Thomas Young, London: J. Murray, vol. 1.

Further reading
 "The Fresnel Lens", The Keeper's Log, Winter 1985, pp. 12–14.
 U.S. Coast Guard, Aids to Navigation, Washington, DC: U.S. Government Printing Office, 1945.
 U.S. Coast Guard, Lighthouses, Lenses, Illuminants, Engineering, & Augustin Fresnel: A Historical Bibliography on Works Published Through 2007.

External links

 United States Lighthouse Society, especially "Fresnel Lenses".
 W.A. Britten, "The Fresnel lens" (with photographs).
 J. Francis, "Fresnel Lens - Maxwell Simulation", 13 April 2009.
 J. Hare, "How the Fresnel lens works" (5-minute video), Vega Science Trust, 2008.
 .

Lenses
Lighthouse fixtures
Solar thermal energy
French inventions